There are currently two main types of power plants operating in Nigeria: (1) hydro-electric and (2) thermal or fossil fuel power plants. With a total installed capacity of 8457.6MW (81 percent of total) in early 2014, thermal power plants (gas-fired plants) dominates the Nigerian power supply mix. Electricity production from hydroelectric sources (% of total) in Nigeria was reported at 17.59% in 2014, according to the World Bank collection of development indicators, compiled from officially recognized sources. There have been two main types of fossil fuel/thermal power plants in the country: (i) coal-fired and (ii) natural gas-fired.

Ownership 

The power plants are classified, based on ownership, as either:
 Fully owned by the Federal Government of Nigeria (FGN). There is a plan to privatize these power plants. 
 Owned by the Niger Delta Power Holding Company (NDPHC). The NDPHC is owned by the three tiers of government in Nigeria (Federal, State and Local). These power plants are referred to as being part of the National Integrated Power Project (NIPP).
 Wholly owned by state governments and/or private companies/individuals. Such a power plant is referred to as being an Independent Power Producer (IPP).

Capacity, generation and demand 

As of December 2013, the total installed or nameplate capacity (maximum capacity) of the power plants was 6,953 MW. Available capacity was 4,598 MW. Actual average generation was 3,800 MW.

As of December 2014, the total installed capacity of the power plants was 7,445 MW. Available capacity was 4,949 MW. Actual average generation was less than 3,900 MW.

The Presidential Task Force on Power's peak demand forecast is 12,800 MW (April 2015).

Fossil fuel power stations

Natural gas 

Coal

The Oji River Thermal Power Plant was a coal-fired power plant. It is no longer operational.

Hydroelectric

In service

Under construction or proposed

Solar

Under construction or proposed

See also 

 List of power stations in Africa
 List of largest power stations in the world

References 

Nigeria
Power stations